William or Willie Bell may refer to:

Arts and entertainment
 William Bell (artist) (1735–1794), English portrait painter
 William Bell (architect) (1789–1865), Scottish-born architect who practiced in North Carolina
 William Bell (photographer) (1830–1910), English-born American photographer
 William Henry Bell (1873–1946), English composer
 William Bell (tuba player) (1902–1971), American tuba player and teacher
 William J. Bell (1927–2005), American writer and producer of TV soap operas
 William Bell (singer) (born 1939), American soul singer and songwriter
 William Bell (author) (1945–2016), Canadian young adult fiction author
 William Brent Bell, American film director
 William Bell (Fringe), character from the 2008–2013 TV series Fringe

Politics and law

United Kingdom
 William Bell (lawyer) (c. 1538–1598), English lawyer
 William Bell (apothecary) (died 1668), English apothecary and politician who sat in the House of Commons
 Cory Bell (William Cory Heward Bell, 1875–1961), British MP for Devizes

United States
 William Bell Jr. (politician) (1828–1902), American politician from Ohio
 William H. Bell (Wisconsin politician) (1863–?), American politician from Wisconsin
 William A. Bell (born 1949), mayor of Birmingham, Alabama

Other countries
 William R. Bell (1876–1927), Australian colonial District Officer in the Solomon Islands, assassinated
 William Henry Dillon Bell (1884–1917), New Zealand politician
 William Henry Bell (businessman) (fl. 1930s), British businessman and politician in Hong Kong
 William F. Bell (1938–2013), Canadian politician; mayor of Richmond Hill, Ontario
 William Montgomerie Bell, merchant and politician in colonial Victoria, Australia

Religion
 William Bell (bishop) (died 1343), Scottish Bishop of St Andrews
 William Bell (priest) (1625–1683), English archdeacon of St Albans and sermon writer
 William Bell (field preacher) (fl. 1670s), Scottish minister and prisoner on the Bass Rock
 William Bell (theologian) (1731–1816), English theologian
 William Bell (clergyman) (1780–1857), Scottish-born Presbyterian minister in Upper Canada
 William Yancy Bell (1887–1962), American bishop for the Christian Methodist Episcopal Church

Sports

Association football (soccer)
 William Bell (Welsh footballer) (1859–?), Welsh footballer
 William Bell (English footballer) (1905–1937), English footballer (Sheffield United, Grimsby Town, Hull City)
 Willie Bell (born 1937), Scottish football player and manager

Other sports
 William P. Bell (1886–1953), American golf course architect
 Billy Bell (ice hockey) (1891–1952), Canadian ice hockey player
 William Bell (baseball) (1897–1969), American Negro league baseball pitcher and manager
 William M. Bell (1909–1991), American football player and coach
 William Bell Jr. (baseball) (born 1930), American Negro league baseball pitcher
 William Bell (American football) (born 1971), American football player
 William Lawrence Bell, Jr (pickleball) (1924–2006), one of the creators of the racket sport pickleball

Others
 William Bell (East India Company), East India Company factor in Iran; his grave being the oldest British grave in Iran
 William Bell (Canadian businessman, born 1806) (1806–1844), Canadian businessman and militia officer
 William Nathaniel Bell (1817–1887), American pioneer; settled Seattle, Washington
 William Abraham Bell (1841–1921), English physician and photographer of the American west; founder of Manitou Springs, Colorado
 William Robert Bell (1845–1913), Canadian militia officer, farmer, and businessman
 William H. Bell (fl. 1860s),  African-American servant of William Seward
 William Harrison Bell (1927–2016), American oral and maxillofacial surgeon
 William Dwane Bell (born 1978), New Zealand criminal
 William J. Bell (entomologist), American entomologist
 William Francis Bell, golf course architect

Other uses
 William Bell, No. 24, 1865 pilot boat used by the Sandy Hook pilots in New Jersey

See also
 Billy Bell (disambiguation)
 Bill Bell (disambiguation)